"We Be Clubbin'" is the first single from Ice Cube's soundtrack, The Player's Club.  The single was minor success, only making it to No. 32 on the Rhythmic Top 40 single chart. Several remixes were made, all featuring DMX and DJ Clark Kent, 2 Clark World Remixes, one with DMX and Sonja Blade and one without Blade and The Eye of the Tiger Remix which sampled Survivor's "Eye of the Tiger".  At the end of the song, Ice Cube shouts out his homeboys, homegirls and the club workers.  He then shouts out cities to "show him love in the club":  Los Angeles, San Francisco Bay Area, Chicago, St. Louis, Miami, New York City, Detroit, Houston, Kansas City, Denver, Washington, D.C. (explicit version only), Atlanta, Memphis, Dallas and New Orleans (clean version only).

Music video

The video shows Ice Cube riding on a makeshift rocket traveling to clubs in big cities and interacting with all the patrons and employees of the clubs.

"We Be Ballin'"

In 1998, a remix titled "We Be Ballin'" was produced, featuring Shaquille O'Neal (spoken intro + verses) and Michael Jackson (on chorus). This remix was to be released on an NBA compilation album scheduled for the end of 1998 and was also going to be featured in commercials for NBA's "I Love This Game" campaign. Michael Jackson was brought on this project by Shaquille O'Neal who had previously guest-starred on the track "2 Bad" on Jackson's album HIStory: Past, Present and Future, Book I (1995). The entire project was finally shelved due to the player-initiated strike against the league that year. Unlike We Be Clubbin', the song features no vulgar language. The song leaked online.

Versions
Master Mix – 4:46
Master Mix (w/ fade out) – 5:08
Street Mix – 5:12
Work in Progress – 5:28

Track listing

Charts

References

Ice Cube songs
Michael Jackson songs
1997 songs
DMX (rapper) songs
Songs written by Ice Cube
Songs written by DMX (rapper)

Music videos directed by Paul Hunter (director)